The King Baudouin Foundation (KBF) (KBS) is a foundation based in Brussels (Belgium). It seeks to change society for the better and invests in inspiring projects and individuals.

The Foundation was set up in 1976, on the occasion of the 25th anniversary of King Baudouin's reign  and has been under the honorary Presidency of Queen Mathilde since 2015.

The Foundation supports projects in Belgium and at the European and international level. To support its international goal, the KBF set up a US public charity and an office in New York City. Since 1999, the KBFUS facilitates philanthropy in the US, Europe and Africa. In 2017, KBFCanada was launched.

Organisational structure 
The King Baudouin Foundation Advisory Council and the Board of Governors determine the key areas of work.

The board of governors is chaired by Thomas Leysen.

The managing director is Luc Tayart de Borms, who is being succeeded by Brieuc Van Damme.

Domains of action 
The King Baudouin Foundation supports projects in various fields of action:

 Social justice and poverty
 Health
 Heritage and culture
 Social engagement
 Africa, Latin America, Asia
 Education and development of talents
 Europe
 Climate, the environment and biodiversity

In 2021, the King Baudouin Foundation and the Funds it administers provided 132.541.857 euro in support to 1.448 individuals and 3.508 organizations. KBF also organises debates on important social issues, shares research results through free publications, enters into partnerships, and encourages philanthropy, in Belgium, in Europe and at the international level.

See also
 Prince Albert Fund

References

External links
 
 King Baudouin Foundation United States (KBFUS)

Foundations based in Belgium
Organizations established in 1976